Alain "Bill" Deraime is a French blues singer (born 2 February 1947 in Senlis, Oise).

Discography
 Bill Deraime (LP - 1979)		 	 
 Plus la peine de frimer (LP - 1980)		 	 
 Qu'est-ce que tu vas faire ? (LP - 1981)	 	 	 
 Entre deux eaux (LP - 1982)	 	 	 
 Live Olympia (Live LP - 1983)	 	 	 
 Fauteuil piégé (LP - 1984)	 	 	 
 Énergie positive (LP - 1985)
 La Porte (LP - 1987)	 	 	 
 Toujours du bleu (CD - 1989) with "Sur le bord de la route" French cover of (Sittin' On) The Dock of the Bay (Otis Redding - Steve Cropper).	 	 
 Mister Blues (compilation - 1990)		 	 
 Louisiane (CD - 1991)		 	 
 Live (live CD - 1993)		 	 
 Tout recommençait (CD - 1994)	 	 	 
 Avant la paix (CD - 1999)		 	 
 C'est le monde (CD - 2000)		 	 
 Quelque part (CD - 2004)		 	 
 Live au New Morning (live CD - 2005)		 	 
 Bouge encore (CD - 2008)
 Brailleur de fond (CD - 2010)
 Après demain (CD - 2013)
 Nouvel horizon (CD - 2018)
 Nouvel horizon Vol.2 (CD - 2021)

See also
 List of French singers

References

External links
 Official site
 Discover the interview of Bill Deraime on E.K. TV (with English subtitles) as well as his songs "Entre deux eaux", "Encore bouger", "Je rêve" et "Le chanteur maudit"

1947 births
French blues singers
Living people